110th meridian may refer to:

110th meridian east, a line of longitude east of the Greenwich Meridian
110th meridian west, a line of longitude west of the Greenwich Meridian